Qarah (also Romanized as Qaraḩ) is a village in Falard Rural District, Falard District, Lordegan County, Chaharmahal and Bakhtiari Province, Iran. At the 2006 census, its population was 1,229, in 278 families.

References 

Populated places in Lordegan County